This is a list of French natural gas companies :
Altergaz
Antargaz (Parent company : UGI Corporation)
Direct Énergie
EDF
Engie
Poweo
Kakljug
Réseau GDS/Énerest (formerly named Gaz de Strasbourg)

See also 

 Lists of public utilities

France Natural gas companies
 
Natural Gas
French natural gas